Joy is an unincorporated community  west of the intersection of Farm to Market Road 173 and State Highway 148,  south of Henrietta in southern Clay County, Texas, United States.  The population was about 45 in 2000.

History
Joy Creek runs through the Joy oilfield north of the community. Joy was first known as Fanninton when it was established by a group of settlers from Fannin County about 1880. One of the pioneer families had a sick child who died on the way west and the mother refused to leave its gravesite.  In 1881 the community had a small log-cabin school and a Methodist church.  The large, expansive grasslands attracted the Red River Cattle Company to Joy in the late 19th century. In 1895 the community petitioned for a post office because mail was often mixed with mail for Fannin County.  The origin of the name Joy was dictated by the US Post Office. The post office operated until 1930. Bypassed by every major US and state thoroughfare and railroad through Clay County, the community never flourished.  Oil discovered in 1942 boosted the population to its current level of 150, one of the few small, unincorporated towns in Clay County to actually grow during the 20th century.  In 1990 the nearby Joy field had 14 oil wells with an annual production of 25 million barrels of crude oil. The population of Joy was reported as 150 in 1990.

Education
Joy is served by the Midway Independent School District (Clay County, Texas), so called because it is situated midway between Joy and Bluegrove.

Notes and references

References

Unincorporated communities in Texas
Unincorporated communities in Clay County, Texas
Wichita Falls metropolitan area